Doin' It Big is the collaborative studio album by American rappers 8Ball and E.D.I. The album was released on April 1, 2008, by Real Talk Entertainment.

Track listing

Charts

References

2008 albums
E.D.I. albums
Real Talk Entertainment albums
Albums produced by Big Hollis
Collaborative albums
Gangsta rap albums by American artists